Girls You Don't Marry is a 1924 German silent comedy film directed by Géza von Bolváry and starring Ellen Kürti, Karl Beckersachs, and Paul Otto.

It was shot at the Bavaria Studios in Munich. The film's sets were designed by the art director Otto Völckers.

Cast

References

Bibliography

External links

1924 films
Films of the Weimar Republic
German silent feature films
Films directed by Géza von Bolváry
German black-and-white films
1924 comedy films
German comedy films
Bavaria Film films
Films shot at Bavaria Studios
Silent comedy films
1920s German films
1920s German-language films